China Kingho Group is the largest private coal mining company in China.

In 2011, the company announced a large investment in Mozambique.  The company is to build a coal terminal at the Beira port and upgrade the Sena railway which links to the Moatize coal mines. 

A planned development of coal fields in Pakistan's south Sindh province collapsed in August 2011. The $19 billion proposed deal would have been Pakistan's largest foreign investment deal.

References

External links

English official website
Company Introduction

Coal companies of China
1996 establishments in China